Brian L. Strom (born December 8, 1949) - is inaugural Chancellor of Rutgers Biomedical and Health Sciences and the Executive Vice President for Health Affairs at Rutgers University. Strom was the Executive Vice Dean for Institutional Affairs, Founding Chair of the Department of Biostatistics and Epidemiology, Founding Director of the Center for Clinical Epidemiology and Biostatistics, and Founding Director of the Graduate Program in Epidemiology and Biostatistics, at the Perelman School of Medicine of the University of Pennsylvania. In addition to writing more than 650 papers and 15 books, he has been principal investigator for more than 275 grants. He was honored as one of the Best Doctors in America, for each of his last eight years at Penn.

Early life and education 
Brian Leslie Strom was born on December 8, 1949, in New York City. He grew up Floral Park, New York and attended Martin Van Buren High School in Queens Village. As an undergraduate, Strom attended Yale University, where he earned his Bachelor of Science degree in molecular biophysics and biochemistry. After graduating, he received his Doctor of Medicine at The Johns Hopkins University School of Medicine. Following his medical internship and residency in Internal Medicine at University of California, San Francisco, he earned a Master of Public Health degree in Epidemiology from the University of California, Berkeley while concurrently serving as an National Institutes of Health Research Fellow in Clinical Pharmacology at the University of California, San Francisco.

Career 
Strom is the Inaugural Chancellor of Rutgers Biomedical and Health Sciences (RBHS) and the Executive Vice President for Health Affairs at Rutgers University. RBHS is composed of eight schools and seven major centers/institutes, and includes academic, patient care, and research facilities. These are most of the units of the former University of Medicine and Dentistry of New Jersey (UMDNJ), now dissolved, several Rutgers University units with health-related missions, and two research units historically co-managed by Rutgers and UMDNJ. The integration of these entities is designed to create a single organization that will lead to new models for clinical care and community service, educate the next generation of health care providers utilizing health care team approaches, and conduct research. Dr. Strom was formerly the Executive Vice Dean for Institutional Affairs, Founding Chair of the Department of Biostatistics and Epidemiology, Founding Director of the Center for Clinical Epidemiology and Biostatistics, and Founding Director of the Graduate Program in Epidemiology and Biostatistics, all at the Perelman School of Medicine of the University of Pennsylvania (Penn). He was honored as one of the Best Doctors in America, for each of his last eight years at Penn.

Strom's major research interest is in the field of pharmacoepidemiology, i.e., the application of epidemiologic methods to the study of drug use and effects. He is recognized as a founder of this field and for his pioneer work in using large automated databases for research. He is editor of the field's major text (now in its fifth edition) and Editor-in-Chief for Pharmacoepidemiology and Drug Safety, the official journal of the International Society for Pharmacoepidemiology. As one of many specific contributions, his research was pivotal in prompting the American Heart Association and American Dental Association to reverse 50 years of guidelines, and recommend against use of antibiotics to prevent infective endocarditis, instead of recommending for this widespread practice. In addition to writing more than 650 papers and 15 books, he has been principal investigator for more than 275 grants, including over $115 million in direct costs alone. Strom has been invited to give more than 450 talks outside his local area, including presentations as the keynote speaker for numerous international meetings. He has been a consultant to NIH, FDA, CDC, USP, AAMC, JCAHO, foreign governments, most major pharmaceutical manufacturers, and many law firms.

Strom is also a nationally recognized leader in clinical research training. At Penn, Strom developed graduate training programs in epidemiology and biostatistics. More than 625 clinicians trained through the largest of these programs, which leads to a Master of Science in Clinical Epidemiology. All but approximately 65 have appointments in academic or other research institutions. Strom was PI or Co-PI of 11 different NIH-funded training grants (T32, D43, K12, and K30), each of which supported clinical epidemiology trainees in different specialties and subspecialties, and was the primary mentor for more than 40 clinical research trainees and numerous junior faculty members. Internationally, Dr. Strom was a key contributor to the conceptualization and planning that led to the development of the International Clinical Epidemiology Network (INCLEN), created in 1979 with support provided by the Rockefeller Foundation to provide clinical research training to clinicians from selected developing country sites. Penn was an INCLEN founding member and one of five training centers. INCLEN Phase I, from 1979 through 1995, resulted in the establishment of 26 clinical epidemiology units in Latin America, India, Africa, and Southeast Asia.

Research 
Strom’s major research interest is in the field of pharmacoepidemiology, the application of epidemiologic methods to the study of drug use and effects. He is recognized as a founder of this field and for his pioneering work in using large databases for research.  He is editor of the field's major text (now in its sixth edition) and Editor-in-Chief for Pharmacoepidemiology and Drug Safety, the official journal of the International Society for Pharmacoepidemiology

Honors 
 1969 J. Willard Gibbs Society, Yale University
 1974 Second Prize, Alfred A. Richman Essay Contest, American College of Chest Physicians
 1983 Elected Fellow, American College of Physicians
 1985 Elected Fellow, American College of Epidemiology
 1988 M.A. (honoris causa), University of Pennsylvania
 1990 Elected Member, American Epidemiological Society
 1991 Elected Fellow, College of Physicians of Philadelphia
 1992 Elected Member, American Society for Clinical Investigation
 1992 Pfizer Visiting Professorship in Clinical Pharmacology, Georgetown University Medical Center
 1992 University of Pennsylvania School of Medicine, Class of 1992 Class Teaching Award
 1999 Naomi M. Kanof Clinical Investigator Award, Society for Investigative Dermatology
 2000 Elected Member, Association of American Physicians
 2001 Samuel Martin Health Evaluation Sciences Research Award
 2001 Elected Member, Institute of Medicine of the National Academy of Sciences
 2002 Commended Paper, ISPE - Pharmacoepidemiology and Drug Safety Best Article Award
 2002 UPHS Quality Award for Reducing Antibiotic Use for Head Cold and Chest Cold
 2002 Rawls-Palmer Progress in Medicine Award, American Society for Clinical Pharmacology and Therapeutics
 2002 George S. Pepper Professor of Public Health and Preventive Medicine
 2003 Charles C. Shepard Science Award, Centers for Disease Control and Prevention
 2003 Elected Fellow, International Society of Pharmacoepidemiology
 2003 Leonard M. Schumann Lecturer, University of Michigan School of Public Health, 38th Graduate Summer Session in Epidemiology
 2003 National Academy of Sciences/National Research Council, National Associate
 2003 The John M. Eisenberg Memorial Lecture, University of California at San Francisco
 2004-05 Sigma Xi Distinguished Lecturer, Sigma Xi, The Scientific Research Society
 2004 Christian R. and Mary F. Lindback Award for Distinguished Teaching, The Lindback Society
 2005-2006 Recognized by Best Doctors in America
 2006 Best Paper Award, Circulation
 2006 Sustained Scientific Excellence Award, International Society for Pharmacoepidemiology
 2007-2008 Recognized by Best Doctors in America
 2008 John Phillips Memorial Award for Outstanding Work in Clinical Medicine, American College of Physicians
 2008 Elected Fellow, American College of Preventive Medicine
 2008 Harry Guess Memorial Lecture, The University of North Carolina School of Public Health Chapter of the International Society for Pharmacoepidemiology, Department of Epidemiology
 2008 Winner, ISPE - Pharmacoepidemiology and Drug Safety Best Article Award
 2008 Commended Paper, ISPE - Pharmacoepidemiology and Drug Safety Best Article Award
 2009-2010 Recognized by Best Doctors in America
 2009 UPHS Quality and Patient Safety Honorable Mention Award, University of Pennsylvania Health System
 2011-2012 Recognized by Best Doctors in America
 2011 National Associate of the National Academies
 2012 Contraception Outstanding Article Award for 2012
 2013 Association for Clinical and Translational Science/American Federation for Medical Research National Award for Career Achievement and Contribution to Clinical and Translational Science for translation from clinical use into public benefit and policy
 2013 Dennis J. Sullivan Award, New Jersey Public Health Association
 2014 Alpha Omega Alpha medical honor society
 2016 Oscar B. Hunter Career Award in Therapeutics, American Society of Clinical Pharmacology and Therapeutics
 2017 Honorary President, The Hellenic Society of Pharmacoepidemiology
 2018 Honorary Doctorate, Democritus University of Thrace, Alexandropolis, Greece
 2019 Roy A. Bowers Award, Rutgers Ernest Mario School of Pharmacy

Selected publications

Books
 Strom BL (ed). Pharmacoepidemiology. New York: Churchill Livingstone, 1989.
Strom BL, Velo GP (eds). Drug Epidemiology and Postmarketing Drug Surveillance. New York: Plenum Press, 1993.
Strom BL (ed). Pharmacoepidemiology (Second Edition). Sussex: John Wiley, 1994.
Strom BL (ed). Pharmacoepidemiology (Third Edition). Sussex: John Wiley, 2000.
Joellenbeck LM, Zwanziger LL, Durch JS, Strom BL (eds). Committee to Assess the Safety and Efficacy of the Anthrax Vaccine, Medical Follow-up Agency. The Anthrax Vaccine: Is It Safe? Does It Work? Washington, DC: National Academy Press, 2002.
 Strom BL (ed). Pharmacoepidemiology (Fourth Edition). Sussex: John Wiley, 2005.
Committee on Smallpox Vaccination Program Implementation, Board on Health Promotion and Disease Prevention; Baciu A, Anason AP, Stratton K, Strom BL (eds). The Smallpox Vaccination Program: Public Health in an Age of Terrorism. Washington, DC: The National Academies Press, 2005.
Strom BL, Kimmel SE (eds). Textbook of Pharmacoepidemiology. Sussex: John Wiley, 2006.
Strom BL, Kimmel SE, Hennessy S (eds). Pharmacoepidemiology (Fifth Edition). Sussex: John Wiley 2012.
Strom BL, Yaktine AL, Oria M. Sodium Intake in Populations: Assessment of Evidence. Washington, DC: The National Academies Press, 2013.
Strom BL, Kimmel SE, Hennessy S (eds). Textbook of Pharmacoepidemiology (Second Edition). Chichester: JohnWiley, 2013.
Committee on a National Strategy for the Elimination of Hepatitis B and C, Board on Population Health and Public Health Practice, Health and Medicine Division; Buckley GJ, Strom BL (eds). Eliminating the Public Health Problem of Hepatitis B and C in the United States: Phase One Report. Washington, DC: The National Academies Press, 2016.
Committee on a National Strategy for the Elimination of Hepatitis B and C, Board on Population Health and Public Health Practice, Health and Medicine Division; Buckley GJ, Strom BL (eds). Eliminating the Public Health Problem of Hepatitis B and C in the United States: Phase Two Report. Washington, DC: The National Academies Press, 2017.
Strom BL, Kimmel SE, Hennessy SH (eds). Pharmacoepidemiology (Sixth Edition). John Wiley and Sons, 2019.
 An Approach to Evaluate the Effects on Concomitant Prescribing of Opioids and Benzodiazepines on Veteran Deaths and Suicides. Strom BL, Bohnert AS, Gerhard T, Hernan M, King VL, Lewis R, Merlin J, Paddock S (eds). The National Academies Press, 2019.

References

Living people
1949 births
Yale University alumni
University of California, Berkeley alumni
Perelman School of Medicine at the University of Pennsylvania alumni
Rutgers University faculty
Martin Van Buren High School alumni
Members of the National Academy of Medicine